Elizabeth "Zibi" Turtle is a planetary scientist at the Johns Hopkins University Applied Physics Laboratory.

Education 
Turtle earned her B.S. in physics from the Massachusetts Institute of Technology in 1989. She earned her Ph.D. in planetary science from the University of Arizona in 1998.

Research
After earning her Ph.D., Turtle worked at the university in the Department of Planetary Sciences and at the Planetary Science Institute in Tucson, Arizona. She joined the Applied Physics Laboratory at Johns Hopkins University in Baltimore, Maryland in 2006.

Turtle was an associate of the imaging team on the Galileo mission and an associate of the imaging and RADAR teams on the Cassini mission. She also serves as a co-investigator working with the camera on board the Lunar Reconnaissance Orbiter spacecraft. She has co-authored many scholarly articles about planetary impact features, surface processes, and planetary imaging and mapping.

Turtle is the Principal Investigator on the Europa Imaging System (EIS) instrument, which was selected for inclusion on the Europa Clipper to the moon Europa. She is also  the principal investigator of the Dragonfly spacecraft, a mission proposal to the 2017 NASA New Frontiers mission solicitation, which was selected on 27 June 2019. The mission entails a relocatable dual-quadcopter lander to investigate the surface composition and meteorology of Titan.

Turtle is the primary author on dozens of scientific publications and co-author on many more.

Awards 
2008, 2009, 2010, 2015: NASA Group Achievement Awards - Cassini Titan Integration Science Team, Cassini Imaging Science Team, Cassini Titan Orbiter Science Team, Lunar Reconnaissance Orbiter (LRO) Team, LRO Extended Science Mission Team

See also
List of women in leadership positions on astronomical instrumentation projects

References

External links
 Zibi Turtle: Even though it is not always easy… being a planetary scientist is one of the coolest jobs on the planet!
 Elizabeth Turtle profile at APL

Living people
Planetary scientists
MIT Department of Physics alumni
University of Arizona alumni
Women planetary scientists
1967 births